The Buenos Aires City Legislature (commonly known as the ) is a central part of the Government of the City of Buenos Aires, Argentina.

History

The internecine warfare between those who favored a united Argentina with a strong central government (Unitarios) and Buenos Aires Province leaders who favored an independent nation of their own (Federales) dominated local political life in the decades following the Wars of Independence and led to the 1880 Federalization of Buenos Aires. Pursuant to this new policy, in 1882 President Julio Roca signed National Law 1260, which created the presidential prerogative of the appointment of the Mayor of Buenos Aires, as well as a city council by way of compromise towards the put-upon local gentry.

The newly formed city council (Consejo Deliberante) originally included 30 Concejales elected via male suffrage (though this excluded the city's immigrants, which made up a majority of voting-age males at least as late as 1914). The body first met during the tenure of Mayor Torcuato de Alvear, with whom a precedent for a productive relationship was established by cooperating on an unprecedented urban planning a renewal agenda. The council's resolution in 1921 for new grounds befitting a governing body of what had become one of the world's most prosperous cities was likewise approved by the Mayor at the time, José Luis Cantilo. A lot to the southwest of the Plaza de Mayo was set aside for the new building's construction, and was inaugurated on October 3, 1931.

The 1994 reform of the Argentine Constitution led to the rescission of the President's right to appoint the Mayor of Buenos Aires, and with the election of Fernando de la Rúa as the city's first directly elected mayor on June 30, 1996, an assembly was chosen for the purpose of drafting a new municipal constitution. Approved on October 1, the document created a city legislature in lieu of the city council, and increased its membership to 60 (elected for four year terms via party-list voting, as outlined in the D'Hondt method, with half the seats at stake every two years).

Overview
The body is led by the mayor's lieutenant, the Vice Chief of Government (Vicejefe de Gobierno), who acts as President of the Legislature. They are assisted by three Vice-Presidents and Parliamentary, Administrative and Coordinating Secretaries. Gabriela Michetti of the center-right Republican Proposal (PRO) party became the first disabled individual to occupy the post of President of the Legislature in 2007; she left this post ahead of the June 2009 legislative elections, where she won a seat in the Argentine Chamber of Deputies. The post is currently occupied by Vice Chief of Government Diego Santilli of PRO.

Current composition
The body is composed of 23 committees, and the 60 legislators belong to 16 parties (a number of which form part of coalitions).

The largest party currently seating in the Legislature is Mayor Horacio Rodriguez Larreta's Vamos Juntos (JxC) with 26 seats, joined in 2019 by Martin Lousteau's Evolution and Roy Cortina's Socialist Party, adding 9 and 2 seats respectively for a total of 37 deputies under the Juntos por el Cambio banner. The largest opposition block is Matías Lammens's Frente de Todos with 17 seats, followed by the Workers' Left Front (FIT) with 3 seats. The single-member blocks of Roberto Lavagna's Federal Consensus Luis Zamora's Self-determination and Freedom, (AyL) and Margarita Stolbizer's Generation for a National Encounter complete the 60 seats.

Represented political groups

List of current legislators (2021–2023 term)

Notes

Past legislatures

2019–2021 term

Notes

See also

Chief of Government of Buenos Aires
Buenos Aires City Legislature Palace

References

External links

  
 Datasheet at Towerclocks.org

City councils
1882 establishments in Argentina
Politics of Argentina
Buenos Aires
Buenos Aires